Abraham Flexner (November 13, 1866 – September 21, 1959) was an American educator, best known for his role in the 20th century reform of medical and higher education in the United States and Canada.

After founding and directing a college-preparatory school in his hometown of Louisville, Kentucky, Flexner published a critical assessment of the state of the American educational system in 1908 titled The American College: A Criticism. His work attracted the Carnegie Foundation to commission an in-depth evaluation into 155 medical schools in the US and Canada. It was his resultant self-titled Flexner Report, published in 1910, that sparked the reform of medical education in the United States and Canada. Flexner was also a founder of the Institute for Advanced Study in Princeton, which brought together some of the greatest minds in history to collaborate on intellectual discovery and research.

Biography

Early life and education
Flexner was born in Louisville, Kentucky on November 13, 1866. He was the sixth of nine children born to German Jewish immigrants, Ester and Moritz Flexner. He was the first in his family to complete high school and go on to college. In 1886, at age 19, Flexner completed a B.A. in classics at Johns Hopkins University, where he studied for only two years. In 1905, he pursued graduate studies in psychology at Harvard University, and at the University of Berlin. He did not, however, complete work on an advanced degree at either institution.

Personal life
Flexner had three brothers named Jacob, Bernard and Simon Flexner. He also had a sister named Rachel Flexner.

The success of Abraham Flexner's experimental schooling allowed him to help finance Simon Flexner's medical education at Johns Hopkins School of Medicine. He proceeded to become a pathologist, bacteriologist and a medical researcher employed by the Rockefeller Institute for Medical Research from 1901 to 1935.

Flexner also financed his sister's undergraduate studies at Bryn Mawr College. Jacob ran a drugstore and used the profits from selling the establishment to attend medical school. He then practiced as a physician in Louisville. Bernard pursued a career in law and later practiced in both Chicago and New York.

In 1896, Flexner married a former student of his school, Anne Laziere Crawford. She was a teacher who soon became a successful playwright and children's author. The success of her play Mrs. Wiggs of the Cabbage Patch (based on the 1901 novel) funded Flexner's studies at Harvard and his year abroad at European universities. The couple supported women's suffrage and had two daughters Jean and Eleanor. Jean went on to become one of the original employees of the United States Division of Labor Standards. Eleanor Flexner became an independent scholar and pioneer of women's studies.

Flexner grew up in an Orthodox Jewish family; however, early on he became a religious agnostic.

In addition to contributions by his brother Simon, their nephew, Louis Barkhouse Flexner, was founding director of the Mahoney Institute of Neurological Sciences at the University of Pennsylvania and a former editor of the Proceedings of the National Academy of Sciences.

Death
Flexner died in Falls Church, Virginia, in 1959 at 92 years of age. He was buried in Cave Hill Cemetery in Louisville, Kentucky.

Career

Experimental schooling
After graduating from Johns Hopkins University in two years with a degree in classics, Flexner returned to Louisville to teach classics at Louisville Male High School. Four years later, Flexner founded a private school in which he would test his growing ideas about education. Flexner opposed the standard model of education that focused on mental discipline and a rigid structure. Moreover, "Mr. Flexner's School" did not give out traditional grades, used no standard curriculum, refused to impose examinations on students, and kept no academic record of students. Instead, it promoted small learning groups, individual development, and a more hands-on approach to education. Graduates of his school were soon accepted at leading colleges, and his teaching style began to attract considerable attention.

The American College
In 1908, Flexner published his first book, The American College. Strongly critical of many aspects of American higher education, it denounced, in particular, the university lecture as a method of instruction. According to Flexner, lectures enabled colleges to "handle cheaply by wholesale a large body of students that would be otherwise unmanageable and thus give the lecturer time for research." In addition, Flexner was concerned about the chaotic condition of the undergraduate curriculum and the influence of the research culture of the university. Neither contributed to the mission of the college to address the whole person. He feared that "research had largely appropriated the resources of the college, substituting the methods and interest of highly specialized investigation for the larger objects of college teaching."

His book attracted the attention of Henry Pritchett, president of the Carnegie Foundation, who was looking for someone to lead a series of studies of professional education. The book consistently cited Pritchett in discussions of views on educational reform, and the two soon arranged to meet through the then-president of Johns Hopkins University, Ira Remsen. Although Flexner had never set foot inside a medical school, he was Pritchett's first choice to lead a study of American medical education, and soon joined the research staff at the Carnegie Foundation in 1908. Although not a physician himself, Flexner was selected by Pritchett for his writing ability and his disdain for traditional education.

Flexner Report

In 1910, Flexner published the Flexner Report, which examined the state of American medical education and led to far-reaching reform in the training of doctors. The Flexner Report led to the closure of most rural medical schools and five out of seven African-American medical colleges in the United States given his adherence to germ theory, in which he argued that if not properly trained and treated, African-Americans and the poor posed a health threat to middle/upper class European-Americans. His position was:

Ironically, one of the schools, Louisville National Medical College, was located in Flexner's hometown. In response to the report, some schools fired senior faculty members in a process of reform and renewal.

Influence on Europe
Flexner soon conducted a related study of medical education in Europe. According to Bonner (2002), Flexner's work came to be "nearly as well known in Europe as in America." With funding from the Rockefeller Foundation, Flexner "...exerted a decisive influence on the course of medical training and left an enduring mark on some of the nation's most renowned schools of medicine." Bonner worried that "the imposition of rigid standards by accrediting groups was making the medical curriculum a monstrosity," with medical students moving through it with "little time to stop, read, work or think." Bonner (2002) calls Flexner "the severest critic and the best friend American medicine ever had."

New Lincoln School
Between 1912 and 1925, Flexner served on the Rockefeller Foundation's General Education Board, and after 1917 was its secretary. With the help of the board, he founded another experimental school, the Lincoln School, which opened in 1917, in cooperation with the faculty at Teachers College of Columbia University.

Institute for Advanced Study

The Bambergers, heirs to a department store fortune, were set on creating a medical school in Newark, New Jersey that gave admissions preference to Jewish applicants in an effort to fight the rampant prejudice against Jews in the medical profession at that time. Flexner informed them that a teaching hospital and other faculties required a successful school. A few months later, in June 1930, he had persuaded the Bamberger siblings and their representatives to fund instead the development of an Institute for Advanced Study.

The institute was headed by Flexner from 1930 to 1939 and it possessed a renowned faculty including Kurt Gödel and John von Neumann.

During his time there, Flexner helped bring over many European scientists who would likely have suffered persecution by the rising Nazi government. This included Albert Einstein, who arrived at the Institute in 1933 under Flexner's directorship.

Universities: American, English, German
In his 1930 Universities: American, English, German, Flexner returned to his earlier interest in the direction and purpose of the American university, attacking distractions from serious learning, such as intercollegiate athletics, student government, and other student activities.

Legacy
 The Flexner Report and his work in education has had a lasting impact on medical and higher education. The specific impacts of the Flexner Report on American and Canadian medicine include:
 Average physician quality has increased significantly
 Medicine has become a lucrative and well-respected profession
 A physician must receive at minimum six years, preferably eight years of post-secondary education, typically in a university setting
 Medical education is based on research, specifically in the fields of human physiology and biochemistry
 Medical research follows the same protocols as scientific research
 The state government must approve the founding of any medical school and medical schools are subject to state regulation 
 The state branches of the American Medical Association oversee all the conventional medical schools in each state
 The Institute for Advanced Study, which Flexner co-founded, has been conducting valuable research for over 80 years in attempt to understand the complexities of the physical world and humanity

Honors
The Association of American Medical Colleges created the Abraham Flexner Award for Distinguished Service to Medical Education to annually recognize individuals who have made a notable contribution to American medical education. In 2020, "in light of racist and sexist writings" the AAMC renamed the award, removing Flexner's name. 
The University of Kentucky College of Medicine has the Academy of Medical Educator Excellence in Medical Education Award, which was formerly named the Abraham Flexner Master Educator Award, to recognize achievement in six categories: 
 Educational Leadership and Administration
 Outstanding Teaching Contribution or Mentorship
 Educational Innovation and Curriculum Development
 Educational Evaluation and Research
 Faculty Development in Education
 Abraham Flexner Way in downtown Louisville's hospital district was named by the Louisville Board of Aldermen in November 1978 to honor Flexner.

Bibliography
 1908. The American College: A Criticism 
 1910. Medical Education in the United States and Canada.
 1910. Medical Education in the United States and Canada (at Google Books).
 1912. Medical education in Europe; a report to the Carnegie foundation for the advancement of teaching. 
 1916. A Modern School.
 1916 (with Frank P. Bachman). Public Education in Maryland: A Report to the Maryland Educational Survey Commission.
 1918 (with F.B. Bachman). The Gary Schools.
 1927 "Do Americans Really Value Education?" The Inglis Lecture 1927(Harvard University Press)
 1928. The Burden of Humanism. The Taylorian Lecture at Oxford University.
 1930. Universities: American, English, German.
 1939. Flexner Abraham (1939 June/November). The Usefulness of Useless Knowledge. Harpers, Issue 179, pp. 544–552. .
 1940. I Remember: The Autobiography of Abraham Flexner. Simon and Schuster. Fulltext 
 1943. A biography of H.S. Pritchett.

See also
Charles Flexner (born 1956), American physician, clinical pharmaceutical scientist, academic, author and researcher
James Thomas Flexner (1908–2003), American historian and biographer
Simon Flexner (1863–1946), physician, scientist, administrator, and professor

References

Further reading
Bonner, Thomas Neville, 2002. Iconoclast: Abraham Flexner and a Life in Learning. Johns Hopkins Univ. Press. .
 
 
 
 
 
 
 Nevins, Michael, 2010. Abraham Flexner: A Flawed American Icon. iUniverse. .
 Starr, Paul, 1982. The Social Transformation of American Medicine. Basic Books. .
 Wheatley, S. C., 1989. The Politics of Philanthropy: Abraham Flexner and Medical Education. University of Wisconsin Press. .

External links

 Jacob, The Other Flexner (offers biographical information about Abraham)
 Amy E. Wells: "Flexner, Abraham (1866–1959)." In: Encyclopedia of Education. 2002.
 Biography of Flexner from the Institute of Advanced Studies
 Abraham Flexner and the era of medical education reform. (critically places Flexner and his contributions within the context of social and educational reform of the time)
 Full text of the "Medical education in the United States and Canada; a report to the Carnegie Foundation for the Advancement of Teaching"

1866 births
1959 deaths
20th-century American biographers
American male biographers
20th-century American educators
American education writers
American people of German-Jewish descent
Harvard Graduate School of Arts and Sciences alumni
Directors of the Institute for Advanced Study
Johns Hopkins University alumni
Writers from Louisville, Kentucky
Rockefeller Foundation people
Burials at Cave Hill Cemetery
Medical educators